The following table is a selected list of awards and honors given to the Japanese film director Akira Kurosawa.

Categories
The list represents three categories of film awards or honors:
 Best Film awards given to a Kurosawa-directed film, whether Kurosawa directly received the award or not (including "Foreign Film" awards);
 Best Director or Best Screenplay awards to Kurosawa for a Kurosawa-directed film;
 Career achievement awards.

For reasons of space, two categories of awards have been excluded from the table below:
 Nominations for awards given to either Kurosawa himself or to films he directed which he or the film did not subsequently win (e.g., the nomination of Throne of Blood for the Venice Film Festival Golden Lion award in 1957; his own nomination for Best Director for Ran at the 58th Academy Awards);
 Awards given to cast members of Kurosawa-directed films, or to crew members other than Kurosawa (e.g., Toshiro Mifune’s Best Actor prize for Yojimbo at the 1961 Venice Film Festival; Emi Wada’s Oscar for Ran at the 1985 Academy Awards).

Data
The information in the table is derived from the IMDb Akira Kurosawa awards page and the IMDb awards pages for the individual films, supplemented by the filmography by Kurosawa’s biographer, Stuart Galbraith IV, unless otherwise noted.

Key: (NK) = Not known; (P) = Posthumous award

Table

Film Awards

State and National Awards

References

Notes

Citations

Sources

 
 

Awards And Honors
Kurosawa, Akira